The Putti candle-holders are a pair of c.1434-1439 sculptures by Donatello, now in the Musée Jacquemart-André in Paris.

The two works were two child angels described by Vasari as being on the cantoria di Luca della Robbia in Florence Cathedral. The attribution to Donatello is almost universally accepted today and many theorise that they may have been produced to top the cantoria di Donatello in the same location.

Bibliography
 Rolf C. Wirtz, Donatello, Könemann, Colonia 1998. ISBN 3-8290-4546-8

Bronze sculptures in France
Sculptures in Paris
Sculptures by Donatello
1430s sculptures
Collections of the Musée Jacquemart-André